CTFE  is the abbreviation of Chlorotrifluoroethylene

It may also refer to:
 Compile-time function execution
 Chow Tai Fook Enterprises, a Hong Kong-based conglomerate